Oliver Mann is an Australian opera singer and songwriter. He has released three albums, Oliver Mann Sings (2005), The Possum Wakes at Night (2008, Preservation Records) and Slow Bark (2013).

He has also collaborated with amongst others Mick Turner, Joanna Newsom (US), Bowerbirds (US), Deolinda (Portugal) and Nicola Ratti (Italy), to Sarah Blasko, Holly Throsby, Darren Hanlon, and Grand Salvo.

References

External links

Year of birth missing (living people)
Living people
Australian male singers
Australian songwriters